Mark Robinson may refer to:

Entertainment 
Mark Robinson (musician) (born 1967), American musician and founder of Teenbeat Records
Mark Edwin Robinson (born 1980), American film director and screenwriter
Mark Robinson (drummer) (born 1989), American drummer and founder of Storyboard Records
Mark Robinson (Friends), a fictional character in the American sitcom Friends

Politics 
Mark Robinson (English politician) (born 1946), former British Conservative politician
Mark Robinson (Northern Ireland politician) (born 1959), Democratic Unionist Party Northern Ireland Assembly Member
Mark Robinson (Australian politician) (born 1963), Deputy Speaker of the Queensland Legislative Assembly
Mark Allan Robinson (born 1975), Canadian political activist
Mark Robinson (American politician), current Lieutenant Governor of North Carolina

Sports

American football
Mark Robinson (safety) (born 1962), American football player, a former NFL safety
Mark Robinson (linebacker) (born 1999), American football player, an NFL linebacker

Association football
Mark Robinson (footballer, born 1968), retired footballer
Mark Robinson (footballer, born 1981), English professional footballer
Mark Robinson (football manager), English Football Manager

Other sportspeople
Mark Robinson (cricketer, born 1966), English cricketer for Northamptonshire, Yorkshire, Sussex and Canterbury
Mark Robinson (Shropshire cricketer) (born 1984), English cricketer for Shropshire
Mark Robinson (rugby union, born 1974), New Zealand rugby union centre, and later rugby executive
Mark Robinson (rugby, born 1975), New Zealand rugby union scrum half (also briefly played rugby league)
Mark Robinson (rugby league) (born 1964), Australian rugby league footballer
Mark Robinson (darts player) (born 1963), English professional darts player
Mark Robinson (martial artist) (born 1963), South African Martial Artist and Powerlifter

Other
Mark Robinson (Royal Navy officer) (1722–1799), English officer
Mark Robinson (meteorologist) (born 1973), Canadian television meteorologist and storm chaser
Mark Robinson (journalist), chief football writer of the Herald Sun
Mark P. Robinson (1852–1915), Hawaiian business magnate and politician

See also
Marc Robinson (born 1968), Indian actor and model
Marc Robinson (politician) (born 1953), former Australian politician
Marcus Robinson (disambiguation)